Lindaren Volley Amriswil is a Swiss professional men's volleyball club based in Amriswil.

The A-grade men's team established itself as a top-tier Swiss team in the early 1990s and has continuously finished the Swiss championships in top ranks ever since.

The men's semi-professional tema club has qualified for and participated in European Cups several times since 1995.  Several team members have played on the Swiss national team.

Honours
 Swiss Championship
Winners (5): 2008–09, 2009–10, 2015–16, 2016–17, 2021–22

 Swiss Cup
Winners (7): 1998–99, 2008–09, 2011–12, 2016–17, 2017–18, 2018–19, 2021–22

External links
 Club homepage

Swiss volleyball clubs
Volleyball clubs established in 1969
1969 establishments in Switzerland